Immaculate Conception Cathedral School may refer to:
 Immaculate Conception Cathedral School (Philippines), Quezon City, Philippines
 Immaculate Conception Cathedral School, Roman Catholic Diocese of Lake Charles, Louisiana
 Immaculate Conception Cathedral School (Memphis, Tennessee), Memphis, Tennessee